Aliaksandr Darozhka (born 19 August 1991) is a Belarusian biathlete. He made his World Cup debut for Belarus in Oberhof in 2014. He competed at the 2014 Winter Olympics in Sochi, in the individual contest.

References

External links

1991 births
Living people
Biathletes at the 2014 Winter Olympics
Belarusian male biathletes
Olympic biathletes of Belarus
Sportspeople from Minsk